Larry Walker is a baseball player.

Larry Walker may also refer to:

Larry Walker III, state senator in the 147th Georgia General Assembly
Larry Walker (artist) (born 1935), American visual artist
Larry Walker (athlete), US race walker
Larry Walker (politician), former member of the Georgia House of Representatives
Larry Walker (teacher), see Meanings of minor planet names: 16001–17000

See also
Lawrence Walker (disambiguation)
Laurie Walker (disambiguation)